Little Skookum Inlet is a branch of southern Puget Sound which extends westward from Totten Inlet.  The community of Kamilche, Washington is on Little Skookum Inlet.

See also 
 Brown Cove

References 

 Findlay, Jean Cammon, and Paterson, Robin, Mosquito Fleet of South Puget Sound, Arcadia Publishing (2008) .

Geography of Mason County, Washington